Jan van der Lijs (1600 in Breda – 1657 in Rotterdam), was a Dutch Golden Age landscape painter.

Biography
According to Houbraken he was the best pupil of Cornelis van Poelenburch, whose works were often confused with those of his master.

According to the RKD he is known as a pupil of Cornelis van Poelenburch whose only known work today is a drawing in the manner of Jan Both in the collection of the Noordbrabants Museum.

References

1600 births
1657 deaths
Dutch Golden Age painters
Dutch male painters
People from Breda